is a Japanese footballer currently playing as a defender for Ococias Kyoto.

Career statistics

Club

Notes

References

External links 
 

1999 births
Living people
Japanese footballers
Japanese expatriate footballers
Association football midfielders
Singapore Premier League players
Mito HollyHock players
Albirex Niigata Singapore FC players
Ococias Kyoto AC players
Japanese expatriate sportspeople in Singapore
Expatriate footballers in Singapore